The 1969 Connecticut Huskies football team represented the University of Connecticut in the 1969 NCAA College Division football season.  The Huskies were led by fourth year head coach John Toner, and completed the season with a record of 5–4.

Schedule

References

Connecticut
UConn Huskies football seasons
Connecticut Huskies football